Tournoi de France was the French Championship tennis tournament held annually in August at Roland Garros during World War II between 1941 and 1945. Participation was limited to French competitors and local club players. After liberation, this wartime resumption of a prewar tournament that took place in the Zone occupée ceased to be recognized as being part of the annual French Championship (French Open) series. The tournament organizer, the Fédération Française de Tennis, states that the years between 1941–45 was a period when the tournament had been "cancelled".

Finals

Men's singles

Women's singles

Men's doubles

Women's doubles

Mixed doubles

See also
List of French Open men's singles champions
List of French Open women's singles champions

References

Tennis tournaments in France